"Fake" (stylized in caps) is a song recorded by Japanese-American singer-songwriter Ai. It was released on March 31, 2010, by Island Records and Universal Sigma. The song served as the lead single for Ai's eighth studio album, The Last Ai.

Background

This single is the first of Ai's to be released since her greatest hits collection, Best Ai, in the third term 2009. It is one of many releases intended to celebrate Ai's 10th anniversary since her debut, with many further collaborations planned.

Ai and Amuro have worked together twice in the past. Once in 2003 as part of the Suite Chic project on the song "Uh Uh......", and once again in 2006 on Zeebra's song "Do What U Gotta Do" with Namie Amuro & Mummy-D.

Reception

Before the release of the physical single, the track had been downloaded 30,000 times as a cellphone full-length download, and the music video viewed over 50,000 times on YouTube. In May 2010, the RIAJ certified the song as Gold, selling over 100,000 downloads.

Track listing

Charts

Certifications

Notes

References

External links
 Universal Fake profile 

Ai (singer) songs
Namie Amuro songs
2010 singles
2010 songs
Island Records singles

Songs written by Ai (singer)
Universal Sigma singles